Cobra is a 1925 American silent drama film directed by Joseph Henabery and starring Rudolph Valentino and Nita Naldi. It is the screen adaptation of the play Cobra written by Martin Brown, which played at the Hudson Theatre on Broadway in 1924.

Cobra has survived, and has been made available to the public on both VHS and DVD by independent film dealers and major movie distributors.

Plot

Valentino plays Count Rodrigo Torriani, an Italian noble. A charming libertine, his weakness is women, who mesmerise and fascinate him – hence the "cobras" referred to in the title of the film, based on the myth that cobras mesmerise their prey.

Roridgo accepts an invitation from friend Jack Dorning (Ferguson) to come to New York City to work as an antiques expert. While the job is rewarding, Rodrigo finds the temptation from the women surrounding him, including Dorning's secretary Mary Drake (Olmstead) and wife Elise (Naldi), challenging.

When Jack is away, Elise says to Rodrigo that she is in love with him. The two embrace and arrange to meet at a hotel. However, after meeting in a room, Rodrigo decides that he cannot betray his friend and leaves the hotel. It turns out to be a fortunate decision; the hotel burns to the ground in the middle of the night, killing Elise.

Rodrigo desperately wants a relationship with Mary. However, after Elise's death, he turns Mary's attentions toward Jack and decides to leave New York. The film ends with Rodrigo gazing out at the sea and the Statue of Liberty as he sets sail back to Europe.

Cast
Rudolph Valentino as Count Rodrigo Torriani
Nita Naldi as Elsie Van Zile
Casson Ferguson as Jack Dorning
Gertrude Olmstead as Mary Drake
Hector V. Sarno as Victor Minardi
Claire De Lorez as Rosa Minardi
Eileen Percy as Sophie Binner
Lillian Langdon as Mrs. Porter Palmer
Henry Barrows as the store manager
Rosa Rosanova as Marie (uncredited)
Natasha Rambova as A Dancer (uncredited)

Production
The production of Cobra was marred by bickering and soaring production costs.  Furthermore, its studio Paramount Pictures, unhappy with the final film and fearing it would flop with audiences and critics, held off releasing it until Valentino (whose popularity had declined somewhat) appeared in a stronger, unequivocally successful picture.  Eventually Cobra was released in late 1925, a few weeks after what proved to be Valentino's comeback feature, The Eagle (1925).

References

External links

1925 films
American black-and-white films
American silent feature films
Films directed by Joseph Henabery
1925 drama films
Silent American drama films
1920s English-language films
1920s American films